is a Japanese handball goalkeeper for Sony Semiconductor and the Japanese national team.

She represented Japan at the 2013 World Women's Handball Championship in Serbia.

References

Japanese female handball players
1977 births
Living people
Handball players at the 2006 Asian Games
Handball players at the 2014 Asian Games
Handball players at the 2018 Asian Games
Asian Games silver medalists for Japan
Asian Games bronze medalists for Japan
Asian Games medalists in handball
Medalists at the 2006 Asian Games
Medalists at the 2014 Asian Games
Medalists at the 2018 Asian Games
20th-century Japanese women
21st-century Japanese women